The Perfect Storm is a creative nonfiction book written by Sebastian Junger and published by W. W. Norton & Company in 1997. The paperback edition followed in 1999 from HarperCollins' Perennial imprint. The book is about the 1991 Perfect Storm that hit North America between October 28 and November 4, 1991, and features the crew of the fishing boat Andrea Gail, from Gloucester, Massachusetts, who were lost at sea during severe conditions while longline fishing for swordfish  out. Also in the book is the story about the rescue of the three-person crew of the sailboat Satori in the Atlantic Ocean during the storm by the U.S. Coast Guard Cutter Tamaroa (WMEC-166).

The book was adapted for the film of the same title, directed by Wolfgang Petersen and released in 2000. Satori is renamed Mistral in the movie, and the since-retired USCGC Tamaroa is portrayed by a newer, 210-foot medium-endurance cutter.

The book follows the lives of the swordfishing crew of Andrea Gail and their family members before and during the 1991 Perfect Storm. Among the men boarding Andrea Gail were Billy Tyne, Alfred Pierre, David "Sully" Sullivan, Michael "Bugsy" Moran, Dale "Murph" Murphy, and Bobby Shatford, each bringing his own intelligence, physical strength, and hope aboard with him. The men were raised with the expectation that they would become fishermen.  As "Sully" said, even before they had left for their long journey, "It's the money ... If I didn't need the money I wouldn't go near this thing."

Much of the early part of the book gives detailed descriptions of the daily lives of the fishermen and their jobs, and is centered around activities at the Crow's Nest, a tavern in Gloucester popular with the fishermen.

The latter part of the book attempts to reconstruct events at sea during the storm, aboard Andrea Gail as well as rescue efforts directed at several other ships caught in the storm, including the attempted rescue of pararescuemen who were themselves caught in the storm. Lost from the New York Air National Guard HH-60 helicopter was TSgt. Arden "Rick" Smith. A week-long search off the South Shore of Long Island failed to find his remains.  Surviving the helicopter crash were Maj. David Ruvola, Capt. Graham Buschor, SSgt. Jimmy Mioli and TSgt. John Spillane, the second pararescueman aboard.

All six crew members of Andrea Gail were missing, presumed dead. The ship and crew were never found. A few fuel drums, a fuel tank, the EPIRB, an empty life raft, and some other flotsam were the only wreckage ever discovered.

Crew members on Andrea Gail
Frank W. "Billy" Tyne, Jr.: Captain of Andrea Gail.  A good fisherman, with a reputation of being a prosperous fishing captain. Billy's ex-wife is Jodi Tyne.
Robert "Bobby" Shatford:  Born March 22, 1961, Bobby was a native of Gloucester, Massachusetts. In his high school years, Bobby played lacrosse. Before boarding Andrea Gail, he lived above his favorite hang-out, The Crow's Nest, where his mother, Ethel, would tend the bar. Bobby was dating Christina "Chris" Cotter, whom he met through his sister, Mary Anne. Chris soon became his fiancée. Bobby had two children from a previous marriage. He accepted the spot on Andrea Gail because he needed money to pay the child support that he owed his ex-wife. Bobby planned this fishing trip to be the last one before settling down and marrying Chris. It was said that Bobby was not only the youngest fisherman on the boat, but the most inexperienced as well.
Dale "Murph" Murphy:  In the story Murph is 33 years old.  He is from Bradenton Beach, Florida.  He is physically described to have shaggy black hair, a thin beard, and Mongolian eyes.  Murph has a three-year-old child and an ex-wife named Debra.  Murph is the cook for Andrea Gail.
David "Sully" Sullivan: A hired fisherman who served to replace a worker on Andrea Gail who dropped out of the job.  Sully is well known in Gloucester for saving his entire crew on one fishing voyage.
Michael "Bugsy" Moran: A crew member on Andrea Gail.  Described as an amiable person with a crazy reputation.
Alfred Pierre: Described by Junger as, "An immense, kind Jamaican from New York City."  Before departure Pierre is described as going back and forth in deciding whether he is going on the fishing trip or not.  He does eventually go on the trip.  Pierre is also described to be shy yet well-liked.

Other important people
Bob Brown: The owner of the F/V Andrea Gail. Captain Billy Tyne is known for 'hate talking' to Brown and often sends messages to him through Captain Greenlaw. Junger describes Brown's reputation in Gloucester as complex. He is known for being a successful owner but criticized for being a risk taker. To some he is known as "Suicide Brown."
Linda Greenlaw: Greenlaw was captain of the F/VHannah Boden (sister ship to Andrea Gail) and a friend of Billy Tyne. The two captains were in radio contact with one another before the F/V Andrea Gail went down.
Albert Johnston: Johnston was captain of the F/V Mary T and part of the Atlantic swordfishing fleet that sailed from Gloucester. Captain Albert Johnston is the last person known to have spoken with Captain Billy Tyne before the F/V Andrea Gail was lost at sea. (This part is omitted from the film, making viewers believe that Greenlaw was the last person to communicate with Captain Billy Tyne). Aboard the F/V Mary T were Captain Johnston's brothers, Captain Paul Johnston and Captain Timothy "Timmy" Johnston.  The Johnston family operated a successful swordfish and fishing tackle business. The Johnston family operated many different fishing vessels, most recently the F/V Canyon Explorer.
Charlie Reed: Former captain of the boat. Reed gives commentary throughout the book on the boats' history.
Ethel Shatford: Bobby's mother, and the owner of the Crow's Nest.
Christina Cotter: Bobby's fiancée
Lawrence Brudnicki: Captain of the U.S. Coast Guard Cutter Tamaroa (WMEC-166) during the 1991 Perfect Storm.

References

External links
Perfect Storm Foundation - dead as of 5/16/2017
Presentation by Junger on The Perfect Storm to the Peabody Essex Museum, November 9, 1997

1991 Perfect Storm
1997 non-fiction books
American non-fiction books
Non-fiction books adapted into films
W. W. Norton & Company books